Taoyuan Subdistrict is a subdistrict in the northwest of Hexi District, Tianjin. It is located at the southwest of Dayingmen and Xiawafang Subdistricts, north of Yuexiu Road and Machang Subdistricts, and southeast of Xinxing and Wudadao Subdistricts. As of 2010, the population of Taoyuan Subdistrict was 51,061.

The subdistrict was named after Taoyuan Village that used to exist in the region.

History

Administrative divisions 
At the time of writing, Taoyuan Subdistrict consisted of 8 communities they are, by the order of their Administrative Division Codes:

Landmark 

 Musée Hoangho Paiho

References 

Township-level divisions of Tianjin
Hexi District, Tianjin